Takayo Fischer (née Tsubouchi; born November 25, 1932) is an American stage, film and television actress, as well as voice-over actress.

Personal life
Fischer was born in Hardwick, California, the youngest of four daughters of Issei (Japanese immigrants) Chukuro, a farm laborer, and Kinko Tsubouchi. During World War II, at age 10, she and her family were forcibly removed from the West Coast following the signing of Executive Order 9066. They spent time in the Fresno Assembly Center before being relocated to Jerome and Rohwer incarceration camps.  

After their release, the Tsubouchi family went to Chicago, Illinois, where, as a young adult, Tsubouchi won the crown of "Miss Nisei Queen."  She graduated from Hyde Park High School in Chicago in 1950 and attended Rollins College from 1951 to 1953, where she was a cheerleader and member of Phi Beta, a performing arts fraternity. She resides in Los Angeles.

In 1980 she married Sy Fischer, an entertainment executive and longtime agent at Hanna-Barbera.

Career
Fischer appeared in the stage production of The World of Suzie Wong in New York in 1958. She won a Drama-Logue Award for ensemble performance for Tea at the Old Globe Theatre in San Diego. She has also appeared in many productions with East West Players in Los Angeles, including Into The Woods. Fischer was an honoree at East West Players' 2019 gala for her work in raising "the visibility of the Asian Pacific American (APA) community through [her] craft." She toured the U.S. and Europe in The Peony Pavilion in 1997.

Fischer has appeared in many big-budget films, including 
Moneyball, Pirates of the Caribbean: At World's End (2007) as Mistress Ching, The Pursuit of Happyness (2006) as Mrs. Chu, Memoirs of a Geisha (2005) and War of the Worlds (2005).  She has also worked on many independent Asian American films including Americanese (2009), Only the Brave (2005), Stand Up for Justice: The Ralph Lazo Story (2004) and Strawberry Fields (1997).

Fischer has had numerous guest-starring roles on network television including FX's It's Always Sunny In Philadelphia as a North Korean bar owner named Mr. Kim, and Mimi Kishi on Netflix and Walden Media’s “The Baby-Sitter’s Club” She is sometimes credited as "Takayo Doran".

Voice work
Fischer has also done voices in several cartoon programs. Some of her well-known roles included Mister T, Battle of the Planets, Rubik the Amazing Cube, A Pup Named Scooby-Doo, Saturday Supercade, The Flintstone Kids, Batman: The Animated Series, Batman Beyond, The All-New Scooby and Scrappy-Doo Show, The Karate Kid, Capitol Critters, The Centurions, The Plastic Man Comedy/Adventure Show, The Heathcliff and Dingbat Show, Super Friends, Thundarr the Barbarian, Rambo, Wildfire, Captain Planet and the Planeteers, Teen Titans, Justice League Unlimited, The Wild Thornberrys, Avatar: The Last Airbender and Justice League.

She also reprised her role as Mistress Ching in the video game version of Pirates of the Caribbean: At World's End.

Filmography
Dad (1989) - Jake's Nurse
Pacific Heights (1990) - Bank Teller
Showdown in Little Tokyo (1991) - Mama Yamaguchi
Baby Brokers (1994) - Dr. Emily Weiss
The Dangerous (1995) - Mrs. Seki
Strawberry Fields (1997) - Takayo
War of the Worlds (2005) - Older Woman
Memoirs of a Geisha (2005) - Tanizato Teahouse Owner
Only the Brave (2006) - Mrs. Nakajo
Americanese (2006) - Keiko Crane
The Pursuit of Happyness (2006) - Mrs. Chu
Pirates of the Caribbean: At World's End (2007) - Mistress Ching
Uncross the Stars (2008) - Tina
Immigrants (2008) - (English version, voice)
Love 10 to 1 (2009) - Grandma
Moneyball (2011) - Suzanne - Billy's Secretary
Model Minority (2012) - Grandma Reiko Tanaka
Silent But Deadly (2011) - Wang
Cavemen (2013) - Elderly Japanese Woman
The Watcher (2016) - Gladys
The Baby-Sitters Club (2020 TV Series) - Mimi Yamamoto

References

External links

Densho Encyclopedia article on Fischer

1932 births
20th-century American actresses
21st-century American actresses
Living people
American film actresses
American television actresses
American voice actresses
American film actors of Asian descent
Actresses from California
American actresses of Japanese descent
American musicians of Japanese descent
Japanese-American internees
People from Kings County, California
American women musicians of Japanese descent